A Chief Minister (—), is the elected head of government of a province in Pakistan. The chief minister is the head of the provincial government, whereas in contrast, the governor is the nominal head, or the "de jure executive" and does everything under the guidance of the chief minister. The chief minister is elected by the provincial assembly, and is the leader of the provincial Legislature.

The parliamentary system in Pakistan follows the Westminster system. Hence the ministers of the provinces are elected by the members of the legislature, and the majority party is invited to elect a leader, whose tenure lasts for five years. The people do not elect the head of the government, rather they elect their representatives only. In turn their representatives select the head of the government. The head of the government, once elected, enjoys almost exclusive executive powers.

Selection process

Eligibility 
The Constitution of Pakistan sets the principle qualifications one must meet to be eligible to the office of the Chief Minister. A Chief Minister must be:

 a citizen of Pakistan
 should be a member of the provincial legislature.

The chief minister is elected through a majority in the provincial legislative assembly. This is procedurally established by the vote of confidence in the legislative assembly, as suggested by the majority party who is the appointing authority.

Oath 
After the successful elections, the swearing is done before the governor of the province. The oath of office, according to the "Articles [2] 130(5) and 132(2)" of the constitution is as follows.

Succession 
The Governor may ask the Chief Minister to continue to hold office until his successor enters upon the office of Chief Minister. The Chief Minister shall continue to hold office until his successor enters upon the office of Chief Minister.
After the dissolution of the provincial assembly, nothing in Article 131 or Article 132 can be construed to disqualify the Chief Minister or a Provincial Minister from continuing in the office.

Current chief ministers

See also 
 List of Chief Ministers in Pakistan
List of Governors of Pakistan

References 

Pakistan provinces
Chief Ministers of Pakistani provinces
Lists of political office-holders in Pakistan
Politics of Pakistan
Pakistani government officials